.id is the Internet country code top-level domain (ccTLD) for Indonesia. Since 2007, it is managed by the Indonesian Internet Domain Name Administrator (Pengelola Nama Domain Internet Indonesia or PANDI), based on regulation set by Decree of Minister of Communication and Information Technology.

Domain names
On 11 March 2013, PANDI approved the adoption of a new desa second level domain for Indonesia's 72,944 villages with autonomy for local affairs.

As of 17 August 2014, second-level domain registrations have entered general availability, allowing registrations to be made directly under .id, without a prefix. This brings the total of available extensions to 13:

 —General use
 —Academic institutions
 —Small and medium commercial entities
 —Commercial entities
 —Villages
 —Government and governmental system(s)
 —Military
 —Personal/Blogs
 —Communication/ISP companies
 —Formal organizations/Community
 —Schools
 —Informal organizations/Personal
 —Islamic Boarding Schools

References

External links
  Choice of PANDI's .id Domain Registration Partners
  Whois Information for .id
  NIC Indonesia (another website)

Country code top-level domains
Internet in Indonesia
Mass media in Indonesia

sv:Toppdomän#I